Neo Ned is a 2005 film starring Jeremy Renner, Gabrielle Union, Sally Kirkland, Cary Elwes, Eddie Kaye Thomas, and Ethan Suplee. It was written by Tim Boughn and directed by Van Fischer.

Synopsis
The film stars Jeremy Renner as Ned Nelson, a white power skinhead who ends up in a mental institution where he meets Rachael (Gabrielle Union), a black woman claiming to be the reincarnation of Adolf Hitler. The unlikely couple's hookup leads them down a shocking road to recovery.

Cast
 Jeremy Renner as Ned
 Gabrielle Union as Rachael
 Sally Kirkland as Shelly Nelson
 Cary Elwes as Dr. Magnuson
 Eddie Kaye Thomas as Joey 
 Ethan Suplee as Orderly Johnny
 Giuseppe Andrews as Josh
 Steve Railsback as Mr Day
 Richard Riehle as Officer Roy Pendleton
 Michael Shamus Wiles as Ned's Dad
 Anthony Morgann as Social Worker

Reception
Mark Olsen gave the film 3.5 out of five in his Los Angeles Times review, where he wrote, "It's a little rough around the edges, to be sure, but with such strong lead performances there is something irresistible in the film's audaciously straight-faced portrayal of such an unlikely relationship." Variety reviewer John Anderson also reviewed the film favorably, writing, "Neo Ned may be ludicrous on paper, but it has what fans of independent film are looking for -- atmosphere, humanity and just a dash of fantastic drama." Film Threat writer Mark Bell gave the film 4.5 out of 5, writing, "Never boring, never pretentious, never preachy, Neo Ned could find its place alongside some of the great independent romance films of all time, if enough people are able to catch a glimpse of it."

The film's treatment of its subject matter and tone was criticized, with Jasmyne Keimig writing that "The disgust over Neo Ned is rightfully deserved. The movie carelessly throws around the n-word and other acts of violence for humor" and L.A. Weekly writer Matthew Duersten stating, "The problem lies in the film's inability to decide whether such loaded images are funny in a Farrelly Brothers/Dave Chapelle  kind of way or if they mean something deeper."

Gabrielle Union expressed dissatisfaction with her performance in this film over Twitter.

Awards
To date, the film has won 10 film awards, out of 10 total nominations.

2005
Slamdance Film Festival 
Best Narrative Feature

2006
Ashland Independent Film Festival
Best Feature Film
  
Newport Beach Film Festival
Outstanding Achievement in Directing, Van Fischer 
  
Palm Beach International Film Festival 
Best Actor, Jeremy Renner 
Best Actress, Gabrielle Union 
Best Director, Van Fischer 
Best Feature

San Diego Film Festival

Best Screenplay - Tim Boughn
Audience Award - Best Narrative Feature
  
Sarasota Film Festival 
Best Narrative Feature

Film release
After three years of festival screenings (from 2005's Tribeca Film Festival premiere to 2008's Suppository Films Reelblack Festival), the film premiered on Starz on August 19, 2008. It was picked up for distribution by CodeBlack Entertainment, which released the film on DVD on December 2, 2008.

References

External links 
Film trailer

American independent films
Films about race and ethnicity
2005 films
Films about racism
Films about interracial romance
2000s English-language films
Skinhead films
2000s gang films
2005 independent films
2000s American films